The Udine electoral district (official name: Friuli-Venezia Giulia - 03 uninominal district) was an uninominal district in Italy for the Chamber of Deputies.

Territory 
As required by law, it was part of the Friuli-Venezia Giulia electoral constituency.

The Udine-district is composed by 42 comuni: Bagnaria Arsa, Bicinicco, Buttrio, Campoformido, Carlino, Castions di Strada, Chiopris-Viscone, Cividale del Friuli, Cordovado, Corno di Rosazzo, Gonars, Latisana, Lignano Sabbiadoro, Manzano, Marano Lagunare, Moimacco, Morsano al Tagliamento, Mortegliano, Muzzana del Turgnano, Palazzolo dello Stella, Palmanova, Pavia di Udine, Pocenia, Porpetto, Pozzuolo del Friuli, Pradamano, Precenicco, Premariacco, Remanzacco, Rivignano Teor, Ronchis, San Giorgio di Nogaro, San Giovanni al Natisone, San Vito al Torre, Santa Maria la Longa, Talmassons, Tavagnacco, Torviscosa, Trivignano Udinese, Udine, Varmo and Visco.

The district was composed by a part of the province of Udine and Pordenone.

The district was part of the Friuli-Venezia Giulia - 01 plurinominal district.

Elected

Electoral results

References 

Constituencies established in 2017
Chamber of Deputies constituencies in Italy